Jack Hehir was an Irish soccer player during the first two decades of the 20th century.

Hehir kept goal for the amateur Bohemians during the early century, winning Leinster Senior Cup medals along the way. However his greatest success was appearing in goal in Bohemians' 1908 Irish Cup winning team when they defeated Shelbourne after a replay. Jack played alongside the likes of Richard Hooper, Ned Brookes and Johnny McDonnell during his time at Dalymount Park.

Hehir represented Ireland once, in 1910.

Honours
 Irish Cup: 1
 Bohemians - 1908

References

Bohemian F.C. players
Year of death missing
Association football goalkeepers
Irish association footballers (before 1923)
Pre-1950 IFA international footballers
Year of birth missing
Place of birth missing
Place of death missing
Northern Ireland amateur international footballers